Pinipe Viswarup, (born on 2 October 1962) is an Indian politician who has worked as Rural Water Supply Minister in YS Rajasekhara Reddy’s cabinet and continued in the same position during Rosaiah’s cabinet. He worked for the welfare and development of Mummidivaram. Viswarup is an active member of YSR Congress Party after the Seemandhra – Telangana issue and he is a supporter of Samaikyandhra movement.

Biography
Viswarup was born on 2 October 1962 at Nadavapalli of East Godavari district to Reddy Panthulu and Seethamma. He has completed his schooling in Eluru and completed B.Sc., B.Ed. in Bombay. Viswarup was active in politics during his college life and later entered into politics. Pinipe Viswarup was married to Meenakshi.

Career
Viswarup was active in college politics and later worked for the welfare and development of Mummidivaram. In recognition of his services, Dr YS Rajasekhara Reddy issued the party ticket to Pinipe Viswarup from that constituency. He was later elected as an MP and became Rural Water Supply Minister. After the tragic death of YS Rajasekhara Reddy, Viswarup carried his responsibilities in the same position as Rural Water Supply Minister in Rosaiah’s cabinet. Later, he extended his services during Kiran Kumar Reddy’s cabinet as Animal Husbandry & Fisheries Minister. Viswarup resigned his position as a Minister and from Indian National Congress Party after the Telangana bill has passed. After this, Pinipe Viswarup joined YSR Congress Party
 and also worked as social welfare minister (2019).

References

Reading
1. Pinipe Viswarup says he will resign the party if the decision is not made in favor of united state http://www.sakshi.com/news/andhra-pradesh/pinipe-vishwaroop-ready-to-resign-for-united-andhra-pradesh-63943

2. Pinipe Viswarup likely to join YSRCP http://english.tupaki.com/enews/view/Congress-Minister-Viswaroop-ready-to-join-in-YSRCP/39702

3. Governor accepts Pinipe Viswarup's resignation http://www.andhraheadlines.com/state/governor_accepts_ministere28099s_resignation-4-120321.html

4. About Pinipe Viswarup http://www.partyanalyst.com/candidateElectionResultsAction.action?candidateId=1852

1962 births
Living people
Andhra Pradesh MLAs 2019–2024
YSR Congress Party politicians